Michałówka  is a village in Poland located in Masovian Voivodeship, in Grójec County, in Gmina Jasieniec. It had a population of 50 in 2005.

Notes

Villages in Grójec County